Heteronympha merope, the common brown, is a species of butterfly of the family Nymphalidae, endemic to the southern half of Australia.

The larvae feed on Poaceae species, including Brachypodium distachyon, Cynodon dactylon, Ehrharta erecta, Poa poiformis, Microlaena stipoides, Poa tenera and Themeda triandra. The common brown butterfly is emerging ten days earlier than it did 65 years ago due to the effects of climate change.

References

 Schlossmann, Jessie. "Climate Change Causing Butterflies to Emerge Ten days Early". Australian Geographic 3-23-10 
 South Australian Butterflies Data Sheet.

External links
 
 

Satyrini
Butterflies of Australia
Butterflies described in 1775
Taxa named by Johan Christian Fabricius